Tapellaria isidiata is a species of corticolous lichen in the family Lecanoraceae. Found in Cameroon, it was described as a new species in 2021 by lichenologists Klaus Kalb and André Aptroot. The type was collected from Campo (South Province), where it was found growing on tree bark on a beach. The lichen has a glossy, mineral-grey thallus with whitish patches, and is bordered by a black hypothallus measuring 0.2–0.6 mm wide. The specific epithet isidiata refers to the presence of isidia, a characteristic of this species: it is the first in genus Tapellaria to have vegetative propagules. The lichen is unreactive to standard chemical spot tests.

References

Pilocarpaceae
Lichen species
Lichens described in 2021
Lichens of Cameroon
Taxa named by André Aptroot
Taxa named by Klaus Kalb